The Uva Next was a franchise cricket team that took part in Sri Lanka Premier League, representing Uva. Success Sports Private Limited purchased the team for $4.6 million in 2012. They was owned for seven years, after which a new agreement may be negotiated.

History
The Uva cricket team was a Sri Lankan cricket team that represented the Uva Province. The team was established in 2004 and only featured in the 2003-04 season of the Inter-Provincial First Class Tournament. The team was captained by Chaminda Vaas. In the 2011 edition of Sri Lanka Premier League the Uva Province team was known as the Uva Unicorns. But after the franchise model was introduced the team owners changed the name to Uva Next.

After the franchise model was introduced for the Sri Lanka Premier League in 2012, Uva made a reappearance in the Sri Lankan cricketing arena as Uva Next. The team was captained by Thilina Kandamby in the 2012 season as their marquee player Chris Gayle could not participate due to an injury.

2012 season

The team was one of only seven teams taking part in the inaugural edition of the Sri Lanka Premier League held in August 2012. During the first player Draft for the inaugural SLPL season, conducted in July 2012, the Uva team bought a number of contemporary star cricketers such as Chris Gayle,  Umar Gul,  Upul Tharanga,  Jacob Oram, Shivnarine Chanderpaul and Thilina Kandamby. Gayle became the costliest player of the draft, as the Uva franchise bought him for $100,000. They also bought Sri Lankan and Foreign Internationals such as  Sachithra Senanayake,  Dilhara Fernando,  Seekkuge Prasanna, Callum Ferguson,  Andrew McDonald, Shoaib Malik and some very promising domestic players such as   Dilshan Munaweera, Banuka Rajapaksha and Charith Jayampathi.

The Uva Next got on to a great start defeating a very strong Basnahira Cricket Dundee team in their opening match. The strong Uva bowling line up which performed really well in their opening match was very well backed up with their batting. But the winning ways quickly came to an end when they met the red hot favorites of the tournament Wayamba United. Though their bowlers restricted the opposition to a competitive score the uva batting collapsed giving Wayamba United the win. Although losing their second match the Uva Next team soon got into winning ways defeating Uthura Rudras and Ruhuna Royals to record two consecutive wins. This meant that they had to win only one more match to qualify for the semi-finals. The next match with the Kandurata Warriors was an important game for both teams meaning that the winner would join Wayamba United in the semi-finals. For the joy of both teams the match was abandoned due to heavy rains this meant that both teams would qualify for the semis. The last match in the group stage was Played against the Nagenahira Nagas this match was an important match because the loser of this match would face Wayamba United in the semi-finals. Both teams were in hot pursuit of winning to avoid facing the strongest team the Wayamba United. Uva Next scored 160 runs but this wasn't enough against a strong batting order plus about three of their best player had to leave during the match due to injury.

In the first semi-final Uva were lucky to retain two of their injured players but they lost Upul Tharanga due to a finger dislocation. Uva had a bad start and was scoring at a slow pace but because of a calm innings by Chandrpaul and a quick fire 40 by Oram Uva managed to score 171 runs. With the ball it was a magical start by uva taking the first 7 wickets for just 27 runs but a good partnership between Azar Mahamood and Isuru Udana Wayaba United scored 151 runs. But this meant that Uva Next would face the Nagenahira Nagas in the final of the inaugural edition of Sri Lanka Premier League. In the final Nagenahira chose to bat they could not get of to a flyer but after 9.1 overs because of rain the game was shorten to a 15 over match Nagas scored 135 curtsy a 27 ball 73 by Angelo Matthews. Knowing the weather Uva got to a flying start but after 5.1 overs rain returned and the match was stopped according to (D/L) method Uva needed to score 44 runs they scored 63 runs and was crowned the first ever champions of SLPL and qualified for the Champions League.

Squad

The captain of Uva Next in the inaugural season of SLPL was supposed to be Chris Gayle but due to an injury the captaincy was awarded to former Sri Lankan vice-captain Thilina Kandamby.Shivnarine Chanderpaul was brought in as a replacement to the fellow West Indian. Chris Gayle was named the icon player for Uva and he received the highest salary in the SLPL of $100,000. The Uva Next squad consisted of six overseas players in the tournament having some of the worlds best T20 players such as Umar Gul. Uva also got some of the best upcoming local Sri Lankan players.

Players with international caps are listed in bold.

Player list

Results

Overall results

Result summary

Semi-final 1

Final

References

External links
Team site on ESPN CricInfo

Sri Lanka Premier League teams
Sports clubs in Sri Lanka
Cricket clubs established in 2012
Cricket clubs disestablished in 2012
2012 establishments in Sri Lanka
Badulla
2012 disestablishments in Sri Lanka